The white-bellied nesomys (Nesomys audeberti), also known as the lowland red forest rat, is a species of rat endemic to Madagascar.

References

Nesomys
Mammals of Madagascar
Mammals described in 1879